CSN 2012 is the eighteenth album by Crosby, Stills & Nash and their fourth live album.  Released in 2012 on Atlantic Records, it is the group's first release on their original label in 18 years.
The album derives from a recording done April 22 on the group's 2012 tour in both audio and video formats.

Background
After reuniting for a Bridge School Benefit in 2010, the surviving members of Buffalo Springfield played seven shows in 2011. In 2012, Stephen Stills, Richie Furay, and Neil Young planned a full-blown Buffalo Springfield tour. After venues had been secured and tour personnel hired, Young dropped out to join up with Crazy Horse for two albums and a tour instead, leaving Stills "in a lurch". Crosby & Nash canceled their plans for a duo tour to reunite with Stills for a Crosby, Stills and Nash tour in place of the Buffalo Springfield tour.

Track listing
The DVD track list is in the same order as the compact disc version.

Disc one

Disc two

Personnel
 David Crosbyvocals, rhythm guitar
 Stephen Stillsvocals, guitars, keyboards
 Graham Nashvocals, rhythm guitar, keyboards
 Shane Fontayneguitars
 James Raymondkeyboards, vocals
 Todd Caldwellorgan
 Kevin McCormickbass guitar
 Steve DiStanislaodrums

References

2012 live albums
Crosby, Stills, Nash & Young live albums
Atlantic Records live albums